Novoselitsky (masculine), Novoselitskaya (feminine), or Novoselitskoye (neuter) may refer to:
Novoselitsky District, a district of Stavropol Krai, Russia
Novoselitskoye, a rural locality (a selo) in Novoselitsky District of Stavropol Krai, Russia